Laurence Sivell (born 6 February 1951 in Lowestoft) is an English former footballer who played in the Football League as a goalkeeper for Ipswich Town and Lincoln City.

Sivell spent 15 years with Ipswich Town, between 1969 and 1984. He made 141 league appearances for the East Anglian club during that time, despite primarily being the understudy to goalkeepers including David Best and Paul Cooper. He  also played two games on loan to Lincoln City in the 1978–79 season. Sivell was noted for his bravery, typically diving at the feet of oncoming strikers to snatch the ball, and had considerable athletic ability to offset his diminutive size (for a goalkeeper). Sivell contributed to Ipswich's victorious 1980-81 UEFA Cup campaign, making one appearance during the run. However he wasn't part of the squad for the final itself.

Together with several Ipswich teammates, Sivell took part in the 1981 film Escape to Victory, known as just Victory in North America. He played the German goalkeeper.

After retiring from football Sivell became a fishmonger.

Honours
Ipswich Town
Texaco Cup: 1973
FA Cup: 1978
UEFA Cup: 1981

Individual
Ipswich Town Hall of Fame: Inducted 2018

References

External links
Laurie Sivell profile at Ipswich Town Talk

1951 births
Living people
People from Lowestoft
Footballers from Suffolk
English footballers
Association football goalkeepers
Ipswich Town F.C. players
Lincoln City F.C. players
Beccles Town F.C. players
UEFA Cup winning players
English Football League players